The Nike Elite Youth Basketball League, also known as Nike EYBL, or simply EYBL, is a basketball circuit for teams of players aged 17 and under. The circuit was founded in 2010 and is composed of AAU travel teams. Both boys and girls play in the EYBL in their respective categories. The EYBL is considered one of the top youth basketball circuits in the United States, and includes one Canadian team.

History 
The EYBL circuit was established in April 2010 with the aim of uniting AAU travel teams and establishing a national championship for youth teams. The EYBL is played in different sessions in different cities across the United States. 42 teams played in the first edition, including the league's singular Canadian team, CIA Bounce. In later editions, other classes such as 16U (for players aged 16 and under) were created. NBA player Chris Paul signed up his AAU team, CP3 All-Stars, for the EYBL; Russell Westbrook also has his team, Team Why Not?.

In May 2018 player James Hampton of Team United of North Carolina collapsed and died during an EYBL circuit game in Hampton, Virginia.

EYBL circuit
The EYBL comprises the top 40 high school basketball circuit teams in America, including one Canadian team. The Peach Jam basketball tournament is played each July, serving as the annual EYBL circuit finals. The Peach Jam is played at the Riverview Park Activities Center in North Augusta, South Carolina Founded in 1996 as the Peach Basket Classic, the pre-existing tournament became the Nike Peach Jam in 1997, and has been included in the EYBL circuit since 2010.

Peach Jam tournament champions

Notable players 
These players have appeared in at least 1 NBA game.

 
Kyle Alexander
Cole Anthony 
Udoka Azubuike
Luka Garza
Scottie Barnes
Jalen Green
Cade Cunningham
Jalen Johnson
James Wiseman
RJ Hampton
Cam Reddish
Grayson Allen
Deandre Ayton 
Mohamed Bamba 
Bol Bol
Marvin Bagley III 
Thomas Bryant
RJ Barrett
Devin Booker
Miles Bridges
Wendell Carter Jr. 
Cheick Diallo 
Hamidou Diallo
Anthony Davis
Trevon Duval
De'Aaron Fox 
Tacko Fall
Harry Giles
Aaron Gordon 
Tyler Herro
Jonathan Isaac 
Jaren Jackson Jr. 
Luke Kennard 
Kevin Knox
Jalen Lecque 
Skal Labissiere
Thon Maker 
Jamal Murray
Tyrese Maxey
Malik Monk
Nerlens Noel 
Jabari Parker
Michael Porter Jr.
Julius Randle
Mitchell Robinson
D'Angelo Russell 
Ben Simmons 
Caleb Swanigan
Collin Sexton 
Dennis Smith Jr.
Omari Spellman
Jayson Tatum 
Gary Trent Jr. 
Jarred Vanderbilt
Andrew Wiggins
Trae Young 
Stephen Zimmerman
Bradley Beal
Jahlil Okafor
Stanley Johnson
Kyle Anderson
Isaiah Briscoe
Jaden Hardy
Paolo Banchero
Jaden McDaniels

References

External links 
 
 Nike Girls EYBL
 Nike EYBL at RealGM.com

2010 establishments in the United States
High school basketball competitions in the United States
Nike, Inc.